David Furr is an American theatre, film, and television actor. He received a Tony Award nomination for his role in Roundabout Theatre Company's Broadway revival of Noises Off.

Selected filmography

Film

Television

Awards and nominations

References

External links
 
 

Living people
American male Shakespearean actors
American male stage actors
American male television actors
Drama Desk Award winners
Year of birth missing (living people)